Gustav Adolph was a Norwegian barque of 757 tons built in 1879 in Arendal, Norway, and wrecked in 1902 on the South African coast some  east of Cape Town.

En route from Fremantle to Cape Town under Captain Anton Gjeruldsen (1862 Barbu, Norway - 1902) with a cargo of 14,000 jarrah sleepers, intended for use by the burgeoning Cape Government Railways, she was wrecked in a strong gale on 28 June 1902 just west of the Palmiet River mouth. Two lifeboats were lowered; the first, carrying six crewmen, made it safely ashore while aboard the second, carrying five people, only one crewman survived. Drowned aboard the second boat were the Captain Gjeruldsen, two crewmen, and a Mr. Perkins, who was a clerk from Perth. Gjeruldsen left behind his wife Inga, 10 years his junior and from Øyestad; a 1900 census showed that the couple were childless.

The greater part of the cargo of sleepers washed ashore and was salvaged. Two crosses made from salvaged timber were erected in memory of those who lost their lives.

References

External links
 Shipping history

1879 ships
Ships built in Arendal
Barques
Tall ships of Norway
Merchant ships of Norway
Maritime incidents in 1902
Shipwrecks of the South African Atlantic coast